Nurobod District (Russian spelling: Nurabad District) is a district in Tajikistan, one of the 9 Districts of Republican Subordination. Formerly known as Darband District, Nurobod District lies east of the city of Roghun, south of the city of Vahdat and Rasht District, and west of Sangvor District. Its southern border is with the Khatlon Region. The capital of Nurobod District is the town Darband. The population of the district is 82,100 (January 2020 estimate).

Administrative divisions
They are as follows:

Notes

References

Districts of Tajikistan